James Thompson (born ) is an English former professional rugby league footballer who played in the 1960s, 1970s and 1980s.

Playing career

International honours
Jimmy Thompson won caps for England while at Featherstone Rovers in 1970 against France, in the 1975 Rugby League World Cup against Australia (2 matches), in 1977 against Wales, and while at Bradford Northern in 1978 against France (sub), and Wales (sub), and won caps for Great Britain while at Featherstone Rovers in 1970 against Australia (2 matches), and New Zealand (2 matches), in the 1970 Rugby League World Cup Australia, France, New Zealand, and Australia, in 1971 against France (2 matches), in 1974 against Australia (3 matches), and New Zealand (3 matches), in the 1977 Rugby League World Cup against France, New Zealand, and Australia (2 matches), and while at Bradford Northern in 1978 against Australia.

County honours
Jimmy Thompson won caps for Yorkshire while at Featherstone Rovers; during the 1969–70 season against Cumberland, during the 1970–71 season against Cumberland and Lancashire, during the 1973–74 season against Cumbria and Lancashire, during the 1974–75 season against Other Nationalities, during the 1975–76 season against Cumbria, Other Nationalities and Lancashire, and during the 1975–76 season against Cumbria and Lancashire.

Challenge Cup Final appearances
Jimmy Thompson played right-, i.e. number 12, in Featherstone Rovers' 17–12 victory over Barrow in the 1966–67 Challenge Cup Final during the 1966–67 season at Wembley Stadium, London on Saturday 13 May 1967, in front of a crowd of 76,290, played right- in the 33–14 victory over Bradford Northern in the 1972–73 Challenge Cup Final during the 1972–73 season at Wembley Stadium, London on Saturday 12 May 1973, in front of a crowd of 72,395, and played right- in the 9–24 defeat by Warrington in the 1973–74 Challenge Cup Final during the 1973–74 season at Wembley Stadium, London on Saturday 11 May 1974, in front of a crowd of 77,400.

County Cup Final appearances
Jimmy Thompson played right-, i.e. number 12, in Featherstone Rovers' 9–12 defeat by Hull F.C. in the 1969–70 Yorkshire County Cup Final during the 1969–70 season at Headingley Rugby Stadium, Leeds on Saturday 20 September 1969, played right- in the 7–23 defeat by Leeds in the 1970–71 Yorkshire County Cup Final during the 1970–71 season at Odsal Stadium, Bradford on Saturday 21 November 1970, and played left-, i.e. number 8, in Bradford Northern's 18–8 victory over York in the 1978–79 Yorkshire County Cup Final during the 1978–79 season at Headingley Rugby Stadium, Leeds on Saturday 28 October 1978.

John Player Trophy Final appearances
Jimmy Thompson played left-, i.e. number 8, in Bradford Northern's 6–0 victory over Widnes in the 1979–80 John Player Trophy Final during the 1979–80 season at Headingley Rugby Stadium, Leeds on Saturday 5 January 1980.

Club career
Jimmy Thompson made his début for Featherstone Rovers on Saturday 1 October 1966.

Testimonial match
Jimmy Thompson's benefit season/testimonial match at Featherstone Rovers took place during the 1976–77 season.

Honoured at Featherstone Rovers
Jimmy Thompson is a Featherstone Rovers Hall of Fame inductee.

References

External links
(archived by web.archive.org) The Millennium Masters – Forwards

1948 births
Living people
Bradford Bulls captains
Bradford Bulls players
Carlisle RLFC players
England national rugby league team players
English rugby league players
Featherstone Rovers players
Great Britain national rugby league team players
Place of birth missing (living people)
Rugby league players from Pontefract
Rugby league props
Rugby league second-rows
Yorkshire rugby league team players